"Back in Black" is a song by Australian rock band AC/DC. It was released as the second US single from their seventh album of the same name in 1980 through Atlantic Records. It is notable for its opening guitar riff. The song was written as a tribute to their former singer Bon Scott, who died in February 1980. In 1981, it reached number 37 on the Billboard Hot 100. In 2012, it reached number 65 in Australia and number 27 in the United Kingdom.

In January 2018, as part of Triple M's "Ozzest 100", the 'most Australian' songs of all time, "Back in Black" was ranked number 22. The song is featured in the movies Iron Man, Megamind, The Muppets, The Smurfs, Spider-Man: Far from Home and other films and TV shows Family Guy and the rest.

Background
Known for its opening guitar riff, the song was AC/DC's tribute to their former singer Bon Scott. His replacement Brian Johnson recalled to Mojo magazine in 2009 that when the band asked him to write a lyric for this song, "they said, 'it can't be morbid – it has to be for Bon and it has to be a celebration. He added: "I thought, 'Well no pressure there, then' (laughs). I just wrote what came into my head, which at the time seemed like mumbo, jumbo. 'Nine lives. Cats eyes. Abusing every one of them and running wild.' The boys got it though. They saw Bon's life in that lyric."

Critical reception

Record Worldsaid the song has "everything that's made the band one of the hottest sellers around: powerhouse rhythm grind, guitar raunch & vocal mania."  In a retrospective piece on "Back in Black", Metal Hammer magazine hailed the song's riff as one of the greatest riffs ever and wrote, "There are rock songs that appeal to metal fans. And there are metal songs that appeal to rock fans. Then there is Back in Black – a rock and metal song that appeals to everybody, from dads to dudes, to little old ladies beating noisy kids over the heads with their sticks – and it all hangs on that monumental, no-nonsense, three-chord monster of a riff." Will Byers from The Guardian said "AC/DC's judicious use of space" in the song helped make it a "classic metal anthem".

The song was ranked No. 4 by VH1 on their list of the 40 Greatest Metal Songs. In 2009, it was named the second-greatest hard rock song of all time by VH1. The song was also ranked No. 187 on Rolling Stones list of 500 Greatest Songs of All Time. The same magazine has also ranked the song No. 29 on their list of "The 100 Greatest Guitar Songs of All Time", and wrote of the song in an accompanying piece: "Angus and Malcolm Young's dual-guitar masterpiece is the platonic ideal of hard rock." In 2020, The Guardian ranked the song number three on their list of the 40 greatest AC/DC songs, and in 2021, Kerrang ranked the song number four on their list of the 20 greatest AC/DC songs.

In 2010, this song sat at No. 2 in Triple M Melbourne's Ultimate 500 Rock Countdown in Australia. The Top 5 were all AC/DC songs.

Commercial performance
As a single, "Back in Black" peaked in the U.S. at No. 37 on the Billboard Hot 100 chart in 1981 as well as at No. 51 on Billboard's Top Tracks chart, which debuted in March 1981. "Back in Black" received the RIAA's Master Ringtone Sales Award (Gold and Platinum) in 2006 and reached 2× Platinum status in 2007. It officially charted on the UK charts after 31 years in release; peaking in at no. 27 because of the band's music becoming available on iTunes. It also reached no. 1 on the UK Rock Charts in the same week.

Sampling
In 1984, the Beastie Boys sampled "Back in Black" without permission for their song "Rock Hard". In 1999, when they wished to include it on an upcoming CD compilation release, they sought permission but AC/DC refused. Mike D of the Beastie Boys quoted Malcolm Young's reason for refusing as: Nothing against you guys, but we just don't endorse sampling.

Covers and other versions

Two live versions of the song later appeared on both versions of the album Live, as well as the Australian tour edition of Stiff Upper Lip. It has been covered by a number of artists, including Living Colour and Shakira. In 2007, Troy "Trombone Shorty" Andrews & Orleans Avenue recorded live at the New Orleans Jazz & Heritage Festival. In 2017, Muse performed the song at the Reading Festival with Brian Johnson on vocals; this was Johnson's first performance in almost two years, as he was previously ordered to halt live performances in order to prevent further hearing damage.

Charts

Weekly charts

Certifications

References

External links
Lyrics on AC/DC's official website

1980 songs
1980 singles
1981 singles
AC/DC songs
APRA Award winners
Atlantic Records singles
Song recordings produced by Robert John "Mutt" Lange
Songs written by Angus Young
Songs written by Brian Johnson
Songs written by Malcolm Young